TrackMania Turbo is a racing video game developed by Firebrand Games. The successor to TrackMania DS, it was released on September 24, 2010 in Europe by Focus Home Interactive, and on April 19, 2011 in the US by City Interactive. It was released at the same time as TrackMania: Build to Race (known as TrackMania in Europe) for the Wii. It received generally favorable reviews from critics.

Gameplay 
Trackmania Turbo features gameplay similar to that of other games in the Trackmania series and includes a comprehensive track editor. There are 150 available tracks across 4 total environments, including Stadium, Island, Coast and Snow! Three game modes are also included; "Race", "Puzzle" and "Platform". Players are able to play together locally up to 4 players, and can play on official or custom tracks through Nintendo Wi-Fi Connection.

Reception 
The game received an aggregate score of 77/100 on Metacritic.

Jon Blyth of Official Nintendo Magazine UK rated the game 83/100, praising the game's loading times and framerates, as well as its Track Editor. However, he criticized the game's smaller number of tracks compared to TrackMania: Build to Race.

References 

2010 video games
Focus Entertainment games
Racing video games
Multiplayer and single-player video games
Nintendo DS games
Nintendo DS-only games
TrackMania
Video games developed in the United Kingdom
Firebrand Games games
CI Games games